Dinmore may refer to:

Places

Australia
Dinmore, Queensland

United Kingdom
Dinmore, Herefordshire
Dinmore Hill, Herefordshire
Dinmore Manor, Herefordshire
Dinmore Tunnel, Herefordshire
Hope under Dinmore, Herefordshire